Striatin-4 is a protein that in humans is encoded by the STRN4 gene.

Interactions 

STRN4 has been shown to interact with STK24.

References

Further reading